Oksana Aleksandrovna Esipchuk (born 13 December 1976 in Bryansk) is a female discus thrower from Russia. Her personal best throw is 63.68 metres, achieved in June 2000 in Tula.

She finished ninth at the 2001 Summer Universiade. In addition she competed at the Olympic Games in 2000 and 2004 as well as the 2005 World Championships without qualifying for the final round.

International competitions

References

sports-reference

1976 births
Living people
Sportspeople from Bryansk
Russian female discus throwers
Olympic female discus throwers
Olympic athletes of Russia
Athletes (track and field) at the 2000 Summer Olympics
Athletes (track and field) at the 2004 Summer Olympics
Athletes (track and field) at the 2008 Summer Olympics
Competitors at the 2001 Summer Universiade
World Athletics Championships athletes for Russia
Russian Athletics Championships winners